Synemosyna formica is a species of ant-mimicking jumping spider. It is found in the eastern United States and parts of Canada.

References

Further reading

External links

 

Salticidae
Articles created by Qbugbot
Spiders described in 1846